Events from the year 1992 in South Korea.

Incumbents 
President: Roh Tae-woo 
Prime Minister: Chung Won-shik until October 8, then Hyun Soong-jong

Events 

 October 8 - Hyun Soong-jong becomes prime minister of South Korea, replacing Chung Won-shik

Births

 February 6 - Jung Yu-ra, handball player
 February 7 - Cheon Eun-bi, field hockey player
 March 13 - Kim Myungsoo, singer and actor
 March 20 - Sandeul, singer
 April 6 – Ken, singer and actor
 May 6 - Byun Baek-hyun, singer
 June 6 - HyunA, dance-pop idol, singer, dancer, rapper, designer, model
 July 5 - Flash, StarCraft: Brood War and StarCraft II player 
 July 12 - Jang Dong-yoon, actor
 September 1 - Woo Hye-rim, singer and rapper
 September 5 - Cha Sun Woo, actor, rapper and singer
 September 14 - Zico (rapper), leader of Block B and rapper
 September 21
 Chen, singer
 Bak Ji-yun, judoka
 September 25 - Kim Jang-mi, sport shooter
 September 26 - Yoo Ah Ra, dancer and singer 
 October 19  - Kim Jiwon, actress
November 10 - Dean, singer-songwriter, rapper and record producer
 November 11 - Choi Min-hwan, singer
 November 27 - Park Chan-yeol, singer and rapper
 December 4 - Kim Seokjin sub-vocalist, Bangtan Boys
 December 22 – Moonbyul, rapper, singer, songwriter and actress

Deaths

 March 19 - Franziska Donner, First lady of The Republic of Korea (b. 1900)

Popular culture
March 23-Seo Taiji and Boys debuted with Seo Taiji and Boys (album).

See also
List of South Korean films of 1992

References

 
South Korea
Years of the 20th century in South Korea
South Korea
1990s in South Korea